Districts in Nepal are second level of administrative divisions after provinces. Districts are subdivided in municipalities and rural municipalities. There are seven provinces and 77 districts in Nepal.

After the state's reconstruction of administrative divisions, Nawalparasi District and Rukum District were divided into Parasi District (officially Nawalparasi (West of Bardaghat Susta) District) and Nawalpur District (officially Nawalparasi (East of Bardaghat Susta) District), and Eastern Rukum District and Western Rukum District respectively.

District official include:

 Chief District Officer, an official under Ministry of Home Affairs is appointed by the government as the highest administrative officer in a district. The C.D.O is responsible for proper inspection of all the departments in a district such as health, education, security and all other government offices.
 District Coordination Committee acts as an executive to the District Assembly. The DCC coordinates with the Provincial Assembly to establish coordination between the Provincial Assembly and rural municipalities and municipalities and to settle disputes, if any, of political nature. It also maintains coordination between the provincial and Federal government and the local bodies in the district.

History 
During the time of king Rajendra Bir Bikram Shah and prime minister Bhimsen Thapa, Nepal was divided into 10 districts. All areas east of Dudhkoshi River were one district, Dhankuta.

Rana regime (1885–1950):
During the time of prime minister Bir Shumsher Jang Bahadur Rana (1885-1901) Nepal was divided into 32 districts and Doti, Palpa and Dhankuta were 3 gaunda (English meaning: Cantonment). Hilly region had 20 districts and Terai had 12 districts.

Even after Bir Shumsher Jang Bahadur Rana to the end of Rana rule in Nepal in 1951 and till the proclamation of new constitution of Kingdom of Nepal in 1962, Nepal remained divided into 32 districts. Each had a headquarters and Bada Haqim (District Administrator) as its head. From 1951 to 1962 many acts and constitutions passed which shows name of districts as below:

Districts Before 1956

Districts from 1956 to 1962

Panchayat era (1960–1990):

In 1962, the reorganisation of traditional 32 districts into 14 zones and 75 development Districts.

District Panchayat was one of the four administrative divisions of Nepal during the Panchayat System (1962–1990). During the Panchayat time the country was divided into 75 districts and now 2 districts are added by dividing Nawalparasi and Rukum into 2 districts. Now the total number of districts is 77.

District Development Committee (1990–2015):

Composed of elected members at the district level. It was responsible for formulating district-level development policies. It was established in 1990, following the end of the Panchayat system.

Districts under new administration 
As of 20 September 2015 Nepal is divided into 7 provinces. They are defined by schedule 4 of the new constitution, by grouping together the existing districts. Two districts, Rukum and Nawalparasi, are split in two parts ending up in two different provinces. The old District Development Committee (DDC) replaced with District Coordination Committee (DCC).

List of districts by province

Koshi Province

Madhesh Province

Bagmati Province

Gandaki Province

Lumbini Province

Karnali Province

Sudurpashchim Province  

From Wikipedia, the free encyclopedia

See also 
 Provinces of Nepal
 Development Regions of Nepal (former)
 List of zones of Nepal (former)
 List of village development committees of Nepal (former)
 District Coordination Committee
 List of mayors of municipalities in Nepal

References

External links 

 01
Subdivisions of Nepal
Lists of subdivisions of Nepal
Districts, Nepal

de:Verwaltungsgliederung Nepals